JOJ WAU is the second niche channel mainly aimed at young, active women in Slovakia. It is primarily a competitor for CME's channel Markíza Doma. The channel, which has launched on April 15, 2013, is owned by J&T Media Enterprises and has a reach of approximately 95% of the country's 5.4 million population. It broadcasts 24 hours per day.

Television WAU showcases top foreign series, soap-operas, shows and movies targeted at young female viewers. This includes J&T's own regionally produced programs, highly rated European and American series and movies, the most popular and newest Latin American soap-operas, infotainment, lifestyle and reality shows dedicated to young women.

Simultaneously with the launch, the HD version of the channel will be launched and it will be distributed in Cable and IPTV platforms.

The channel will extend its programming including highly rated foreign titles as well as gradually delivered locally produced content relevant to its audience.

Original programming
From its start, JOJ WAU will air daily showbusiness and celebrity news called TOP STAR Magazine.

Telenovelas & soap operas

J&T's regionally produced programs

Airing currently
Prefab
If It Had Been  (all seasons)

Coming soon
Below The Surface
Innocents

TV series & miniseries

Airing currently
 Californication (season 1–4)
Bones (season 1-8)
 How I Met Your Mother (all seasons)
 Ghost Whisperer  (all seasons)
Numbers (all seasons)
 The Good Wife (season 1-3)
 Walker, Texas Ranger
 Wizards of Waverly Place (all seasons)

Coming soon
Cashmere Mafia
Dirty Sexy Money (all seasons)
GCB
Jane by Design
Missing
The Nine Lives of Chloe King
Women's Murder Club

Ended
 Gigolos (season 1-2)
 Glee (season 1-4)
Julia Forever
Confusion of the Heart
 Law & Order: Criminal Intent (all seasons)
Stephanie - Angel on Duty (season 1-2)
 The Gates
 The Glades (season 1-2)

TV shows

Airing currently
 America's Got Talent (season 7)
 Bridalplasty
 Clean House (season 1-9)
 Extreme Makeover: Home Edition (all seasons)
  (season 1–3)
 Hotel Hell (season 1)
 Jerseylicious (season 1–3)
 Keeping Up with the Kardashians (season 1–6)
 My Big Redneck Wedding (season 1–2)
 My Parents' House (all seasons)
 Property Brothers (season 1)
  (season 1–4)
 The Real Housewives of New Jersey (season 1–4)
 Wedding SOS (season 1–4)

Coming soon
 Flip This House (all seasons)
The Real Housewives of Atlanta (season 1-4)
The Real Housewives of Miami (season 1)

Ended
 Birth Stories (all seasons)
 Bulging Brides (season 1-3)
 Criss Angel Mindfreak (all seasons)
 Dr. 90210 (all seasons)
Fabulous Cakes (all seasons)
 Hell's Kitchen U.S. (season 1-9)
 I Know My Kid's a Star (all seasons)
 I Used to Be Fat
 Million Dollar Listing Los Angeles (season 1-4)
 Millionaire Matchmaker (season 1-5)
Princess (season 1)
Supersize vs Superskinny  (season 1-6)
 The Real Housewives of Beverly Hills (season 1-2)
 The Real Housewives of New York City (season 1-5)
The Real Housewives of Orange County (season 1-7)
 The X Factor U.S. (season 2)
What's Eating You (all seasons)
 Whose Wedding Is It Anyway? (season 1-12)

External links

 

Mass media in Slovakia
Television channels in Slovakia
Television channels and stations established in 2013